A list of the films produced in Mexico in 1968 (see 1968 in film):

1968

External links

1968
Films
Lists of 1968 films by country or language